Jwaya or Jouaiya, is a town in Tyre district, Lebanon. Located in the center of Jabal Amel geographically, 95 kilometers  from Beirut, and the county seat of Sidon 54 kilometers and 16 kilometers from the city of Tyre towards the east, rising from the sea at 300 m, a land area of 32.000 dunums cultivated arable including grains, vegetables, olives, figs, and recently citrus and fruit.

Location
Municipality of Jwaya is located in the Kaza of Tyre (Ṣūr) one of Mohafazah of South Lebanon kazas (districts). Mohafazah of South Lebanon is one of the eight mohafazats (governorates) of Lebanon. It's 97 kilometers (60.2758 mi) away from Beyrouth (Beirut) the capital of Lebanon. Its elevation is 300 meters (1) (984.3 ft - 328.08 yd) above sea level. Jwaya surface stretches for 978 hectares (9.78 km² - 3.77508 mi²)(2).

History
In 1596, it was named as a village,  Juba, in the Ottoman nahiya (subdistrict) of  Tibnin  under the liwa' (district) of Safad, with a population of  87  households and 38 bachelors, all Muslim. The villagers paid a  fixed tax rate of 25% on  agricultural products, such as wheat, barley,  fruit trees,  goats and beehives, in addition to occasional revenues; a total of 11,859 akçe.

Several lintels have been found here.
In 1881, the PEF's Survey of Western Palestine (SWP)  described it: "A large village, built of stone and of good materials, containing about 1,000 Metawileh. They weave and dye cloth, and have a small market. It is situated on a hill, and is surrounded with olives, figs, and arable land. The water supply is from two springs and
many cisterns."

In mid-August 1986 three French soldiers, members of UNIFIL, were killed by a remote-controlled bomb while jogging through Jwaya. The incident followed the killing of two Amal officials at a French checkpoint. At the time there were 605 French soldiers and 786 logistics staff serving with UNIFIL.

After Operation Accountability, July 1993, some units of the Lebanese army were deployed closer to the Lebanese border with Israel. A small base was established in Jwaya. It was the most southerly point of their deployment.

Educational Establishments
The table below provides a comparison of public and private schools locally and nationally. It can be used to assess the distribution of students between public and private institutions both locally and nationally. All data provided on education concerning the 2005-2006 school year.

Media 
 Ahl Jwaya Group: www.ahljwaya.com
 Jwaya First: www.jwayafirst.com

References

Bibliography

External links 
Survey of Western Palestine, Map 2:   IAA, Wikimedia commons
 Jouaiya, Localliban: Centre de resource sur le developpement local
 Ahl Jwaya website: www.ahljwaya.com
 Council Site: www.jwaya.gov.lb
 Jwaya English website: www.jwaya.com
 Jwayafirst website: www.jwayafirst.com
 AhlJwaya on Facebook : www.facebook.com/ahljwaya

Populated places in the Israeli security zone 1985–2000
Populated places in Tyre District
Shia Muslim communities in Lebanon